Victor John Papp (born 31 May 1946) is a former Australian rules footballer who played with Essendon in the Victorian Football League (VFL). Papp later played for Essendon High School Old Boys, his old side Riverside Stars and was captain-coach of Gladstone Park.

Notes

External links 		
		

Essendon Football Club past player profile
		
		
		
	
Living people
1946 births
Australian rules footballers from Victoria (Australia)		
Essendon Football Club players